is a Japanese ice hockey player for DK Peregrine and the Japanese national team.

She represented Japan at the 2019 IIHF Women's World Championship. She represented Japan at the 2023 Winter World University Games, winning a silver medal.

Her sister, Hikaru Yamashita, also plays for the Japanese national team.

References

External links

2002 births
Living people
Japanese women's ice hockey defencemen
Ice hockey players at the 2022 Winter Olympics
Olympic ice hockey players of Japan
Universiade medalists in ice hockey
Medalists at the 2023 Winter World University Games
Universiade silver medalists for Japan